Megadictynidae is a family of araneomorph spiders first described by Pekka T. Lehtinen in 1967. They are endemic to New Zealand.

Genera and species

, the World Spider Catalog accepted two genera, each with a single species:
Forstertyna Harvey, 1995
Forstertyna marplesi (Forster, 1970) (type species) – New Zealand
Megadictyna Dahl, 1906
Megadictyna thilenii Dahl, 1906 (type species) – New Zealand

References

 
Araneomorphae families
Taxa named by Pekka T. Lehtinen